Nearby Share is a feature of Google's mobile and desktop operating systems Android and ChromeOS which allows data to be transferred via Bluetooth and Wi-Fi. Officially released to the general public on August 4, 2020 as the replacement of Android Beam, it provides rapid short-range exchange of images, videos, text, contact info, directions, YouTube videos, and other data. According to Google, Nearby Share allows users to reduce the time needed to send content down to simple taps.

Description

Usage 
Nearby Share is activated by enabling the feature on both sender and recipient devices. If the content can be sent, a bottom sheet will appear with a list of available contacts to share with. Choosing a contact from the list sends a prompt to the recipient that requires them to confirm the transfer. When the content is sent, both devices will return to the content on their screens closing the bottom sheet which both had open.

Requirements and availability 
To use Nearby Share, both devices need Android 6 and above. Google has also launched Nearby Share on Chromebooks and stated Windows will gain support soon via Chrome browser.

Options 
Nearby Share offers users the option to choose which protocol (defaults to automatic, overridable) among Bluetooth, Bluetooth Low Energy, WebRTC, and peer-to-peer Wi-Fi should be used (by asking whether it can use data) and who can see the user's phone in their lists. It offers the options to make the user's device visible to all their contacts, some specific contacts, everyone nearby, or to no one at all.

See also 
 AirDrop, an Apple version for iOS
 Briar (software), and independent copyleft app for Android
 Shoutr, a free proprietary Wi-Fi P2P multi-user app for sharing files on Android
 Wi-Fi Direct, a similar technology
 Zapya, a free proprietary file transfer over Wi-Fi app

References 

Android (operating system)
Google Chrome
File transfer protocols
Bluetooth